Ranko Simović (born June 7, 1999) is a Serbian professional basketball player who currently plays for FMP of the ABA League as a loaned player of Crvena zvezda mts.

Professional career 
Simović grew up playing basketball for Mladost Čačak. In 2016, he was added to the Crvena zvezda U18 team.

On June 19, 2017, Simović signed a four-year contract with Crvena zvezda. Prior to the 2018–19 season he was loaned out to Vršac. Through 21 games in the 2018–19 ABA 2 season, he averaged 5.5 points, 3.6 rebounds, and 0.9 assists per game. In April 2019, he joined FMP for the rest of the 2018–19 season. In December, he was loaned to Sloboda Užice for the rest of the 2019–20 season.

In May 2022, Simović signed a two-year contract with FMP.

National team career
Simović was a member of the Serbia under-18 team that finished 10th at the 2016 FIBA Europe Under-18 Championship in Samsun, Turkey. Over seven tournament games, he averaged 3.8 points, 4.2 rebounds, and 0.6 assists per game. Simović was a member of the Serbian under-20 team that finished 15th at the 2019 FIBA U20 European Championship in Tel Aviv, Israel. Over seven tournament games, he averaged 9.9 points, 7.1 rebounds, and 1.7 assists per game.

References

External links 
 Profile at eurobasket.com
 Profile at euroleague.net
 Profile at realgm.com

1999 births
Living people
ABA League players
Basketball League of Serbia players
KK Crvena zvezda youth players
KK FMP players
KK Sloboda Užice players
KK Vršac players
Montenegrin expatriate basketball people in Serbia
Small forwards
Serbian men's basketball players
Serbs of Montenegro
Sportspeople from Podgorica